Pierre van Hooijdonk (born 29 November 1969) is a Dutch former professional footballer who played as a striker. He had spells with clubs across Europe where he was a prolific goal scorer. Van Hooijdonk was capped 46 times for the Dutch national team, for which he scored 14 goals and played in the 1998 FIFA World Cup, Euro 2000 and Euro 2004. Noted for his bending free kicks, he is regarded by some as one of the greatest free kick specialists of all time.

Early life
Van Hooijdonk was born in Steenbergen. His Moroccan biological father left Van Hooijdonk's mother before his birth. He grew up in Welberg (nl), a small village near Steenbergen. His favourite team was NAC Breda whose game he followed wholeheartedly. At 11 years old, while playing with local team SC Welberg's youth squad, he took part in a trial on the NAC open day, impressed their scouts and joined the club. At that time he played mainly as a right midfielder; when he was 14, he was cut from NAC's academy and he went into amateur football with VV Steenbergen. He then switched his position to become a striker, and ascended to the club's first team.

Club career

Early career
As RBC Roosendaal were in financial trouble they were obliged to having youth players feature within their senior teams. In the 1988–89 season, Van Hooijdonk made his debut for RBC as a substitute. While playing as a sub for the club he soon scored three goals. With the club's main striker suffering from an injury Van Hooijdonk played almost the majority of the season's second half, scoring six goals in 32 matches. He signed his first professional contract with RBC soon thereafter. Van Hooijdonk made a greater impression in the following season becoming a key player for the team, scoring 27 times in 37 matches. Several teams went on to show interest in him such as NAC Breda. Van Hooijdonk didn't hesitate in signing a contract with NAC, and rejoined his boyhood club.

NAC paid 400,000 guilders for the transfer of Van Hooijdonk. In returning to NAC, he was both positive in his outlook as well as determined to illustrate his quality. Van Hooijdonk succeeded at such going on to help the team win promotion to the Eredivisie in 1993. During his time at the club he got his first call up, in December 1994, to play for the Netherlands. During the rest of that season, he set a scoring streak in 11 consecutive Eredivisie matches. Within the 1994–95 winter break, Celtic made a deal with NAC which saw Van Hooijdonk join up with the Scottish outfit at once. Altogether he scored 81 goals in 115 appearances for NAC.

Celtic
Van Hooijdonk made his Celtic debut on 11 January 1995 in a league match against Hearts at Hampden Park. The striker made an instant impact for his new team by scoring a stunning opening goal. Hearts went on to equalise and so the game finished 1–1. Van Hooijdonk settled quickly at Celtic and he became an instant favourite with the fans. When Van Hooijdonk arrived at Celtic they had not won any trophies in six years. With Van Hooijdonk in tow Celtic won the Scottish Cup of that season with him being the only goalscorer in the final against Airdrie in May 1995.

The following 1995–96 season, saw Van Hooijdonk in outstanding form for Celtic. He scored 32 goals, including 26 in the League which saw him finish as top scorer. Of particular note was his prowess at scoring from free kicks. However, despite Van Hooijdonk's goals and the attractive football being played by manager Tommy Burns' side, Celtic still finished the season without any silverware.

Van Hooijdonk's next season at Celtic, 1996–97, was an unhappy time for both the player and the club. A row with the Celtic chairman/owner, Fergus McCann, would rumble on and as a result, he often ended up on the bench. The manager of the Dutch national team Guus Hiddink then told him he wouldn't be selected for such as long as he was not a regular at Celtic.

He eventually left Celtic over a wage dispute towards the end of the 1996–97 season, stating that the reputed £7,000 a week rise he was being offered might be "good enough for the homeless" to live on "but not for an international striker." In total Van Hooijdonk scored 52 goals for Celtic in 84 appearances. He went on to join up with Nottingham Forest in a deal worth up to £4.5 million.

Nottingham Forest
Van Hooijdonk arrived as Forest were in deep relegation trouble, struggling to maintain their position in the Premier League. He made his debut for Forest in a 1–1 draw against Blackburn on 11 March 1997. It was hoped the arrival of van Hooijdonk would kick-start their survival, but he scored just one goal in his eight games for them that season. Although only one of those games was lost, the other seven were drawn and Forest were relegated. He immediately pledged his future to help the club regain its status.

The following season was an unqualified success, both for him and Forest. Forest won the title and promotion in a competitive league (facing stiff opposition from Sunderland, Charlton and Middlesbrough), with van Hooijdonk scoring 34 goals and building up a good partnership with strike partner Kevin Campbell, who scored 23 times. During the 97-98 season, Van Hooijdonk clashed with manager Dave Bassett over the setup of the team, and desired a move to PSV Eindhoven. Newcastle United also offered £7 million for him, but Bassett would only let Van Hooijdonk go for £10 million. He was a regular in the Dutch national squad, and was named in the Dutch squad for 1998 FIFA World Cup in France where he scored as a substitute in the match against South Korea.

After the World Cup had finished he discovered that the promised strengthening to the Forest squad to enable them to cope back in the Premier League had not transpired, indeed that his strike partner Campbell (who had an ongoing back injury) had been sold to Trabzonspor for £2.5m. The club had also announced that Scot Gemmill was dropped from the first team for refusing to sign a new contract, and that club captain and terrace hero Colin Cooper was being allowed to leave to the team promoted alongside them as runners up, Middlesbrough. Van Hooijdonk asked for a transfer. The club's new owners refused. Van Hooijdonk announced that he had been told previously that he could leave the club at the end of the 1997–98 season if he so wished, that he felt betrayed by the club's owners who had failed to deliver on their promises to him regarding the strengthening of the team, and that he felt he could no longer play for his employers. Forest, desperate for a striker, refused to allow him to be transfer-listed again, so van Hooijdonk announced his intention to strike. He kept fit by training with his former club NAC Breda.

Because of his behaviour, Van Hooijdonk received criticism both from fans and from his teammates, not least from team-mate Steve Stone and manager Dave Bassett. The club refused to listen to offers for him, as they needed a top striker and the stand-off lasted until early November when van Hooijdonk, realising that he had no choice, agreed to return and played in a game against Wimbledon. By this time the club was again in relegation trouble: bottom of the league without a win in nine games. He played sporadically between then and the end of the season. He scored 6 goals in his 19 starts in the Premier League, including his first goal in his second game back against Forest's fierce rivals Derby County, helping them to a draw. Infamously after this goal, most of his team-mates refused to celebrate alongside him, instead going to Scot Gemmill, the man who crossed the ball to him. He also scored a last-minute home equaliser against rivals Liverpool with a trademark free-kick that protected Forest's proud unbeaten home run against them that went back to 1984. In another game against Leicester City he scored to put Forest 1-0 up but was then sent off as they ultimately lost 3-1. Forest ended the 1998–99 Premier League season bottom and were relegated. Ralf Rangnick, then coach of VfB Stuttgart, wanted to bring Van Hooijdonk to Germany, but chairman Gerhard Mayer-Vorfelder refused, feeling that Van Hooijdonk was too expensive at the age of 30.

Vitesse
At the end of the 1998–99 season he returned to the Netherlands with SBV Vitesse in a £3.5m move to continue his career after and did much to convince his critics of his goal-scoring abilities when he helped the Arnhem team to a UEFA Cup spot with 25 goals in one season. He also returned into the Dutch national team in this period.

Benfica
Van Hooijdonk then signed a three-year deal for Benfica in 2000 where he joined up with one of the former Celtic F.C. 'three amigos' Jorge Cadete. He eventually only played one season for them with 19 goals. At Benfica he faced the same structural problems as he faced at Nottingham Forest and the team used three different managers throughout the season. The new chairman at the club had no faith in Van Hooijdonk and he was set back into its second team. Benfica was planning on selling him to another foreign club, but all Van Hooijdonk wanted was to return to his home country. At the end of the 2000–01 season, he signed for his fourth Dutch club, Feyenoord.

Feyenoord
While at Feyenoord, he will always be remembered for his free kick abilities and his integral part in the UEFA Cup 2001–02 win. He scored two goals against Borussia Dortmund in the final at De Kuip and his performances helped Feyenoord beat Freiburg, Rangers, PSV Eindhoven and Inter Milan in earlier rounds.

Later career

Never one to settle down, van Hooijdonk joined Fenerbahçe SK at the beginning of the 2003–04 season where he featured in 52 games for the Turkish club and scored 32 goals (24 in his first season). He was nicknamed Aziz Pierre (means Saint Pierre in Turkish) by fans. He wore the number 17, the same number that he wore for the national team. He won the Süper Lig title in 2003–04 (the first top-tier championship of his career) and again the following year in 2004–05 with Fenerbahçe.

In mid-2005, he signed again for his former club, NAC, playing 17 games, scoring 5 goals. During the winter transfer window of the 2005–06 season, he signed for another former club, Feyenoord, where he scored 8 goals in 37 appearances. On 17 October 2006, Van Hooijdonk announced his retirement at the end of the 2006–07 season. On 13 May 2007, he eventually played his final professional match after a draw with Feyenoord against FC Groningen in the play-offs, having played 550 games (335 goals) in the highest leagues in 18 seasons of professional football.

Personal life
Van Hooijdonk is the father of Sydney van Hooijdonk, who is also a professional footballer.

It was reported in May 2008 that van Hooijdonk had been a victim of fraud and had lost £2,000,000 to a scam, which involved him investing in a Chinese textile company that did not exist.

Career statistics

Honours
Celtic
Scottish Cup: 1994–95

Nottingham Forest
Football League First Division: 1997–98

Feyenoord
UEFA Cup: 2001–02

Fenerbahçe
Süper Lig: 2003–04, 2004–05

Individual
Scottish Premier Division Top Scorer: 1995–96
PFA Team of the Year: 1997–98 First Division
Football League First Division top scorer: 1997–98
Nottingham Forest Player of the Year: 1997–98
UEFA Cup Top Scorer: 2001–02
Eredivisie Top Scorer: 2001–02
Dutch Footballer of the Year: 2001–02
Turkish Footballer of the Year: 2004

References

External links

Pierre's playing profile (from CelticTalk.org The Ultimate Celtic Forum)
Pierre van Hooijdonk at Feyenoord tribute video by frfc1908.nl (4:34 minutes), released 1 May 2007

1969 births
1998 FIFA World Cup players
Association football forwards
Celtic F.C. players
Dutch association football commentators
Dutch expatriate footballers
Dutch expatriate sportspeople in England
Dutch expatriate sportspeople in Portugal
Dutch expatriate sportspeople in Scotland
Dutch expatriate sportspeople in Turkey
Dutch footballers
Dutch sportspeople of Moroccan descent
Eerste Divisie players
English Football League players
Eredivisie players
Expatriate footballers in England
Expatriate footballers in Portugal
Expatriate footballers in Scotland
Expatriate footballers in Turkey
Fenerbahçe S.K. footballers
Feyenoord players
Living people
NAC Breda players
Netherlands international footballers
Nottingham Forest F.C. players
People from Steenbergen
Premier League players
Primeira Liga players
RBC Roosendaal players
S.L. Benfica footballers
SBV Vitesse players
Scottish Football League players
Scottish league football top scorers
Süper Lig players
UEFA Cup winning players
UEFA Euro 2000 players
UEFA Euro 2004 players
Footballers from North Brabant